The Garrison Melmoth was an American homebuilt aircraft that was designed and built by Peter Garrison. The project was commenced in 1968 and it first flew on 6 September 1973. The aircraft was designed and built from scratch, drawing on Garrison's previous experience working on the Practavia Sprite. The Melmoth was destroyed on the ground in 1982, when another aircraft hit it.

Design and development
The aircraft was designed as a research project that would comply with the US Federal Aviation Administration (FAA) experimental-amateur-built rules. It featured a cantilever low wing, a two-seats-in-side-by-side configuration enclosed cockpit under a bubble canopy, retractable tricycle landing gear and a single engine in tractor configuration. Garrison spent over 10,000 hours building the aircraft.

Garrison explains how the aircraft's name was chosen, "I christened it Melmoth, after the Byronic protagonist of the nineteenth-century novel Melmoth the Wanderer, who sells his soul to the devil for, among other valuable considerations, the ability to travel about at will in space and time." Melmoth the Wanderer was written by Charles Maturin and published in 1820.

Its  span rectangular wing with an aspect ratio of 6:1, employed an NACA 65A316 airfoil, mounted double-slotted flaps and adjustable-incidence ailerons. The engine was a Continental IO-360-A producing , driving a Hartzell constant speed propeller of  diameter. Control was via center control sticks.

The Melmoth was registered with the US FAA in the Experimental-Amateur-built category.

Over time the aircraft was modified to include IFR avionics, an automatic fuel tank selection and cycling system, airbrakes, a stabilator T-tail, a turbocharged engine and built-in oxygen.

A follow-on design, the Garrison Melmoth 2, was commenced in August 1981 and first flew on 1 November 2002. The Melmoth 2 bears the same registration, N2MU, that the original aircraft wore.

Operational history
The aircraft was intended for long flights and in 1974 Garrison and his partner Nancy Salter flew the Melmoth to Guatemala, a flight on which they became lost looking for Guatemala City. On 5 August 1975 Garrison and Salter flew from Gander, Newfoundland to Shannon, Ireland nonstop in about 11 hours. On 3 July 1976 the two flew from Cold Bay, Alaska in the Aleutian Islands to Chitose, Hokkaidō, Japan. In 1980 they flew to Mexico, Central and South America.

The Melmoth was destroyed in the summer of 1982 at John Wayne Airport in Orange County, California, when the pilot of a Cessna landing with engine problems lost control of the aircraft and it impacted the Melmoth waiting for takeoff clearance. Garrison reported, "its seven-foot propeller missed me by a foot, but chopped most of Melmoth into scraps". He went on to take note of the damage, "everything that I built was destroyed. Everything that I bought off somebody's shelf—the engine, the avionics, the instruments—survived...I kept the remains for a year, and then, after salvaging what I could, sold the empty hulk to a metal dealer to be shipped to Taiwan and converted into heaven knows what. He paid me $54.30 for it."

Specifications (Melmoth)

References

External links

Homebuilt aircraft
Single-engined tractor aircraft
Melmoth
John Wayne Airport